Joseph S. Illick (September 16, 1884 - August 31, 1967) was Dean of the New York State College of Forestry at Syracuse University, from 1944 to 1951. He was a graduate of Lafayette College (1907), and the Biltmore Forest School (1913); he studied at the University of Munich, as well. Prior to coming to New York, Illick was State Forester, in Pennsylvania.

References

External links 
The Archives from Joseph Illick's tenure as Dean of the New York State College of Forestry are located in the Archives of the SUNY College of Environmental Sciences and Forestry http://www.esf.edu/moonlib/archives/

1884 births
1967 deaths
People from Easton, Pennsylvania
State University of New York College of Environmental Science and Forestry faculty
Leaders of the State University of New York College of Environmental Science and Forestry
Lafayette College alumni
Biltmore Forest School
Ludwig Maximilian University of Munich alumni
20th-century American academics